Phillip Calvin McGraw (born September 1, 1950), better known as  Dr. Phil, is an American television personality and author best known for hosting the talk show Dr. Phil. He holds a doctorate in clinical psychology, though he ceased renewing his license to practice psychology in 2006.

McGraw rose to fame with appearances on The Oprah Winfrey Show in the late 1990s. Oprah Winfrey then helped McGraw launch his own program, Dr. Phil, in September 2002. The show is formatted as an advice show.

Early life and education
McGraw was born in Vinita, Oklahoma, on September 1, 1950, the son of Joseph J. McGraw Jr. and his wife, Anne Geraldine "Jerry" (née Stevens). He grew up with two older sisters, Deana and Donna, and younger sister Brenda in the oilfields of North Texas where his father was an equipment supplier. At age 13, he worked at an A&W Root Beer stand and a local chain called Pizza Planet in Oklahoma City.

McGraw moved to Kansas with his father as his father pursued his lifelong goal of becoming a psychologist. There he attended Shawnee Mission North High School in Overland Park, Kansas. He played linebacker on the high school football team and in 1968 earned a football scholarship to the University of Tulsa, where he played middle linebacker under coach Glenn Dobbs. He later transferred to Midwestern State University in Wichita Falls, Texas.

McGraw graduated in 1975 from Midwestern State University with a B.A. in psychology. He went on to earn an M.A. in experimental psychology in 1976, and a Ph.D. degree in clinical psychology in 1979 at North Texas State University (now the University of North Texas), where his dissertation was titled "Rheumatoid Arthritis: A Psychological Intervention." He did a year of post-doctoral training in forensic psychology at the Wilmington Institute. McGraw's doctoral advisor was Frank Lawlis, who later became the primary contributing psychologist for the Dr. Phil television show.

Early career
After obtaining his doctorate, McGraw rejoined his father in Wichita Falls, Texas, where the elder McGraw had established his private psychology practice.

In 1985, McGraw and his father partnered with Thelma Box, a Texas businesswoman, in presenting "Pathways" self-help seminars. Six years after joining Box, in October 1991 McGraw sold his share in the company for $325,000.

In 1990, McGraw co-founded Courtroom Sciences, Inc. (CSI) with lawyer Gary Dobbs. CSI is a trial consulting firm which provides services in US litigation psychology, jury selection, trial consulting, witness training, and depositions.  CSI has advised top trial lawyers, every major airline in the world, and dozens of Fortune 500 companies. McGraw is no longer an officer or director of the company. The TV show Bull is based on McGraw's experience as a trial consultant, and he is credited as one of the creators of the series. McGraw began working with Oprah Winfrey through CSI.

Television career

Oprah Winfrey and the Dr. Phil show
In 1995, Oprah Winfrey hired McGraw's legal consulting firm CSI to prepare her for the Amarillo Texas beef trial. Winfrey was so impressed with McGraw that she thanked him for her victory in that case, which ended in 1998. Soon after, she invited him to appear on her show. His appearance proved so successful that he began appearing weekly as a relationship and life strategy expert on Tuesdays starting in April 1998.

In September 2002, McGraw formed Peteski Productions and launched his own syndicated daily television show, Dr. Phil, produced by Winfrey's Harpo Studios. Dr. Phil is an advice show, in which McGraw tackles a different topic on each show, offering advice to his guests. He signed a five-year extension of his syndication deal with his show's distributors, King World Productions, Inc. The deal was to pay McGraw $15 million per year and keep the show in production through the 2013–2014 television season.

On May 21, 2007, Dr. Phil was ranked fourth by Nielsen Media Research, with 6.69 million viewers. About one year later, on May 12, 2008, the show was ranked sixth with 5.69 million viewers.  In May 2008 the only talk show more popular than Dr. Phil was The Oprah Winfrey Show.  In 2007 McGraw was 30th on the Forbes Celebrity 100 list. On December 11, 2018 Dr. Phil was the top syndicated show with a "2.9 live-plus-same-day" national Nielsen rating, ranking first among talk shows for the 117th consecutive week. His ranking improved, and by 2020 he was in the 22nd spot on the same Forbes list with earnings of $65.5 million.

Spin-off shows
In 2005, Jay McGraw and Phil McGraw formed Stage 29 Productions, and a week later, announced a new show called Moochers (similar to ABC's Kicked Out). Ultimately, the show was not produced.

In 2006, the Dr. Phil House (similar to CBS's Big Brother) began airing as part of the Dr. Phil television show. Following a protest by neighbors, the house in Los Angeles was shut down, and production resumed on a sound stage on a studio back lot.

Stage 29 launched Decision House in September 2007. It was executive produced by Jay McGraw. featured Judge Lynn Toler (from Divorce Court) on MyNetworkTV. The show produced 13 episodes during one season and ran until May 24, 2008.

Late in 2007, McGraw began promoting the Dr. Phil Show spinoff series The Doctors. The show, which first aired in 2008, is hosted by television personality and ER physician Travis Stork. McGraw's eldest son, Jay McGraw, was executive producer of the show. The Doctors debuted on September 8, 2008, and, as of November 10, 2008, had a 2.0 rating.  The show won a Daytime Emmy Award as Outstanding Talk Show/Informative in 2010 and was nominated 8 times between 2009 and 2013. The show was renewed for its 12th season in 2019.

Daily Mail TV, executive produced by Phil and Jay McGraw along with producers Martin Clarke, Carla Pennington, and Jeffrey Wilson, won the Daytime Emmy Award for Outstanding News Program in 2019.

In August 2021, the reality television series House Calls with Dr. Phil aired on CBS. In the series, McGraw visits various families at home and offers advice on their home life.

Doctor on Demand 
In 2012, McGraw founded the telehealth company Doctor On Demand, an online platform which allowed individuals to schedule virtual appointments with a network of physicians and therapists. The company launched a web and mobile service in 2014. The platform focuses on services related to preventative care, medication management, wellness and mental health. According to ABC News, the company had a network of around 11,000 board certified physicians as of 2015. In March 2020, during the COVID-19 pandemic, the company expanded its bandwidth and increased its pool of therapists in order to deal with the increasing volume of patients seeking virtual consultations and care.

Psychology license 
McGraw stopped renewing his Texas license to practice psychology in 2006. In 2002, the California Board of Psychology determined that because McGraw's television show was more about entertainment than psychology, McGraw did not need a license.

Controversies and lawsuits

1988–2008 
On October 21, 1988, the Texas State Board of Examiners of Psychologists determined that McGraw had hired a former patient for "part-time temporary employment". Specifically, the board cited "a possible failure to provide proper separation between termination of therapy and the initiation of employment", issued a letter of reprimand and imposed administrative penalties. The board also investigated claims made by the patient of inappropriate contact initiated by McGraw, but the "Findings of Fact" document issued by the board on October 21, 1988, at the end of its investigation includes no reference to any physical contact of any kind. It specifically identified "the therapeutic and business relationships" as constituting McGraw's sole issue with the board. McGraw fulfilled all terms of the board's requirements, and the board closed its complaint file in June 1990.

In 2003, McGraw lent his name and image to a line of nutritional supplements, including vitamin packets, meal replacement drinks, and power bars under the brand name Shape Up, under a licensing agreement with CSA Nutraceuticals, a Texas start-up. The deal stipulated that a certain percentage of sales would be given to the Dr. Phil Foundation, a Dallas charity that works on issues like childhood obesity. CSA Nutraceuticals stopped producing the supplements in 2004, after the Federal Trade Commission began investigating it for false advertising. Three disappointed consumers filed a lawsuit in 2004, claiming that it made false or unproven claims. In 2006 a $10.5 million settlement was reached.

In 2003, The Making of Dr. Phil, an unauthorized biography by Sophia Dembling and Lisa Gutierrez, was published by John Wiley and Sons. The book covers McGraw's personal and professional life, including allegations of abuse and unethical practices, with interviews of his childhood friends and former classmates.

In 2006, McGraw was named a co-defendant, along with Paramount, CBS Television, and others in a 2006 lawsuit filed in relation to the disappearance of Natalee Holloway. The lawsuit was filed by Deepak Kalpoe and his brother Satish Kalpoe, who claimed that an interview they did with McGraw, aired in September 2005, was "manipulated and later broadcast as being accurate, and which portrays Deepak Kalpoe and Satish Kalpoe 'as engaging in criminal activity against Natalee Holloway and constitutes defamation.'" On March 17, 2015, the lawsuit against McGraw and CBS was dismissed. The court records disclosed the lawsuit by Deepak and Satish Kalpoe was rejected one week before the civil trial was set to begin.

Another contentious case arose in January 2008, when McGraw visited pop star Britney Spears in her hospital room. The visit by McGraw drew criticism from the Spears family and from mental health professionals. The visit appeared to be part of an attempt at getting Spears and her parents to take part in an "intervention" on the Dr. Phil television show. Immediately after the visit, McGraw issued public statements about Spears' situation that Spears' family spokeswoman Lou Taylor said violated their family trust in McGraw. "This is another example of a trust being betrayed", Taylor told Today co-host Meredith Vieira. "Rather than helping the family’s situation, the celebrity psychologist caused additional damage", she said. Several mental health care professionals criticized McGraw for his actions, but fellow television psychologist Joyce Brothers defended McGraw. It was reported that a psychologist filed a complaint with the California Board of Psychology (BOP), alleging that McGraw had practiced psychology without a license and had violated doctor-patient privilege by discussing Spears' case with the media. A copy of the complaint appeared in the media, but there is no way to verify whether or not it was actually submitted to BOP as it does not disclose that information unless an investigation is opened. Martin Greenberg, a former BOP president, said on the Today Show that this incident was not a matter that the law covers or would be concerned about.

Later in 2008, McGraw was sued by Thomas Riccio, the memorabilia collector responsible for taping the Las Vegas robbery that led to O. J. Simpson's conviction. Riccio sued McGraw in Los Angeles Superior Court for defamation, and other complaints stemming from an interview he did on the Dr. Phil Show  which aired on October 8, 2008. The claims were dismissed, with the judge finding that it was protected speech under the First Amendment.

2016–present 
In 2016, McGraw and his wife filed a $250 million defamation lawsuit against American Media Inc., a publishing company that owns the National Enquirer and Radar Online, due primarily to them publishing an interview from a former patient who had accused McGraw of sexually assaulting her in the 1980s while under his care. McGraw had denied the sexual abuse allegations since they were first made against him in 2003. The lawsuit was later dropped on mutual terms.

In February 2022, around a dozen current and former employees of Dr. Phil alleged that they experienced "verbal abuse in a workplace that fosters fear, intimidation, and racism." Seven current employees also claimed that the show's guests are often manipulated and treated unethically. Attorneys for McGraw and his co-producer, Carla Pennington, categorically denied every allegation made.

McGraw was criticized for an interview featuring former actress Shelley Duvall which aired in 2016. Vivian Kubrick described McGraw's behavior towards Duvall was described as "exploitative" and "apallingly cruel," and called for a boycott of the show.

A former guest on Dr. Phil, Danielle Bregoli, also known as Bhad Bhabie, criticized the methods of Turn-About Ranch, an Escalante, Utah-based therapeutic horse ranch for troubled youth that McGraw had endorsed. McGraw, Viacom and CBS were later sued by Bregoli and Hannah Archuleta, another former guest, in 2022 for recommending their parents send them to Turn-About Ranch. Afterwards, McGraw ceased the recommendation of Turn-About Ranch on Dr. Phil.

Approach to psychology 

McGraw's advice and methods have drawn criticism from both fellow psychotherapists as well as non-experts. McGraw's critics regard advice given by him to be at best simplistic and at worst ineffective or harmful. The National Alliance on Mental Illness called McGraw's conduct in one episode of his television show "unethical" and "incredibly irresponsible". McGraw said in a 2001 Sun-Sentinel interview that he never liked traditional one-on-one counseling, and that "I'm not the Hush-Puppies, pipe and 'Let's talk about your mother' kind of psychologist."

McGraw frequently advises individuals to seek professional help, particularly psychotherapy. A 2016 study at Ohio State University found that viewers were more likely to seek professional mental health care for themselves and their children after seeing McGraw deal with similar issues on the Dr. Phil show. The study attributed this phenomenon to viewers tendency to form a parasocial bond with McGraw through watching the show, and have increased belief in their ability to seek help.

Awards and recognition
McGraw was inducted into the Broadcasting & Cable Hall of Fame in 2015. In 2020 he received a star on the Hollywood Walk of Fame. McGraw was invited to give the presidential address at the 2006 annual convention of the American Psychological Association, where he received the APA's Presidential Citation for “highlighting mental health issues” to “more Americans than any other living psychologist.”

Personal life

McGraw married his first wife, Debbie Higgins McCall, in 1970, when he was 20 years old. According to her, McGraw was domineering and would not allow her to participate in the family business. She claimed that she was confined to domestic duties and instructed to begin lifting weights to improve her bustline. McCall also claimed that infidelity had ended their marriage.

During the process of annulling the marriage in 1973, McGraw met and began dating Robin Jo Jameson, whom he married in 1976. The couple have two children together, Jay McGraw and Jordan McGraw.

McGraw is a private pilot, with an instrument rating, flying single-engine airplanes. He is a Christian. He launched a charity, Dr. Phil Foundation, in October, 2003.

Writing career 
In 1999, McGraw published his first book, Life Strategies. In the next six years, McGraw published three additional relationship books, Relationship Rescue, Self Matters, and Family First.

Selected works

Filmography

Discography

Guest appearances

References

External links

 
 Official biography
 

1950 births
20th-century American non-fiction writers
21st-century American male actors
21st-century American non-fiction writers
American family and parenting writers
American health and wellness writers
21st-century American psychologists 
20th-century American psychologists
American self-help writers
American television talk show hosts
Celebrity doctors
Diet food advocates
Living people
Male actors from Oklahoma
People from Wichita Falls, Texas
People from Vinita, Oklahoma
Popular psychology
Tulsa Golden Hurricane football players
University of North Texas alumni
University of Tulsa alumni
Writers from Oklahoma
Midwestern State University alumni
20th-century American male writers
American Christians
American male non-fiction writers
21st-century American male writers